Catherine Robbe-Grillet (née Rstakian; born 24 September 1930) is a French writer, dominatrix, photographer, theatre and film actress of Armenian descent who has published sadomasochistic writings under the pseudonyms Jean de Berg and Jeanne de Berg.

Biography
She was born in Paris, where she attended secondary school and high school.

L'Image, a sadomasochistic novel published in 1956 by éditions de Minuit, was written under the pseudonym Jean de Berg. Radley Metzger made the novel into a 1975 film, The Image, also known as The Punishment of Anne.

She is also the author of Cérémonies de femmes (ed. Grasset) (1985) written under the pseudonym Jeanne de Berg and Entretien avec Jeanne de Berg (ed. Les Impressions Nouvelles) (2002) under the name Catherine Robbe-Grillet. In 2004, she wrote, under her own name, Jeune mariée: Journal, 1957-1962 (ed. Fayard), an account of the early years of her marriage. Her most recent publication is Le Petit Carnet Perdu (March 2007, ed. Fayard) under the name of Jeanne de Berg.

She had a small part in L'Immortelle (1963) as Catherine Sarayan. Her last appearance as an actress was on stage in 2016, in Savannah Bay by Marguerite Duras, directed by Beverly Charpentier.

She married the French writer and filmmaker Alain Robbe-Grillet in Paris on 23 October 1957; he died in February 2008.

She was featured in Maya Gallus's 1997 documentary film Erotica: A Journey Into Female Sexuality. In 2014, she was the subject of a documentary film entitled The Ceremony, which examines her life as a lifestyle dominatrix and member of the BDSM (sadomasochistic) community.

Publications 
 L'image par Jean de Berg. Paris: Éditions de Minuit, 1956
 Cérémonies de Femmes par Jeanne de Berg. Paris: Éditions Grasset 1985
 Entretien avec Jeanne de Berg par Catherine Robbe-Grillet. Paris: Éditions les Impressions Nouvelles 2002
 Jeune mariée: journal, 1957–1962 par Catherine Robbe-Grillet. Paris: Fayard 2004
 Le Petit carnet perdu par Jeanne de Berg. Paris: Fayard 2007
 "Correspondances" par Catherine Robbe-Grillet : Fayard 2012
 "Alain" par Catherine Robbe-Grillet : Fayard 2012

References

External links 
 Jean (ne) de Berg: A Journey
 
 

1930 births
Living people
HEC Paris alumni
French photographers
French dominatrices
BDSM writers
Women erotica writers
French erotica writers
French film actresses
French people of Armenian descent
French stage actresses
Actresses from Paris
Writers from Paris
Artists from Paris
Sex-positive feminists
20th-century French non-fiction writers
20th-century French actresses